Ottorino Flaborea (born 5 March 1940) is a retired Italian professional basketball player and coach. His nickname as a player, was "Captain Hook", due to his great hook shot. He was inducted into the Italian Basketball Hall of Fame, in 2008.

Club career
Flaborea was a FIBA European Selection, in 1972.

National team career
Flaborea was a part of the senior Italian national basketball teams that won the bronze medal at the 1971 EuroBasket, and finished in fourth place at the 1965 EuroBasket. He also competed at the 1964, 1968, and 1972 Summer Olympic Games, finishing in fifth, eighth, and fourth place, respectively.

References

External links
FIBA Profile
FIBA Europe Profile

1940 births
Living people
Basketball players at the 1964 Summer Olympics
Basketball players at the 1968 Summer Olympics
Basketball players at the 1972 Summer Olympics
Centers (basketball)
Italian basketball coaches
Italian men's basketball players
1970 FIBA World Championship players
Olympic basketball players of Italy
Pallacanestro Biella coaches
Pallacanestro Biella players
Pallacanestro Varese players